The 8th FINA Synchronised Swimming World Cup was held July 16–19, 1997 in Guangzhou, China. It featured swimmers from 13 nations, swimming in three events: Solo, Duet and Team.

Participating nations
13 nations swam at the 1997 Synchro World Cup:

Results

Point standings

References

FINA Synchronized Swimming World Cup
1997 in synchronized swimming
International aquatics competitions hosted by China
1997 in Chinese sport
Synchronized swimming competitions in China